Khan Asifur Rahman Agoon, known as Agun is a Bangladeshi musician. The son of actor Khan Ataur Rahman and singer Nilufar Yasmin, he is notable for songs like "Baba Bole Chhele Nam Korbe", "Amar Shopno Gulo" and "O Amar Bondhu Go".

Career
In 1988, Khan Asifur Rahman Agoon started his career in music as the vocalist of a band named Sudden and released an album titled "Auchena", two years later in 1990. He retired from the band and went solo in 1992. Since then, he performed as playback singer in films including Keyamot Theke Keyamot (1993) and Dui Duari (2000).

Agoon also played roles in films like Akhono Onek Raat, '71 Er Ma Jononi and television dramas including Ojana Shoikotey and Ronger Manush.

Personal life
Agoon has a sister, Rumana Islam. He has two children: Moshal and Michhil.

Awards
 Bachsas Award (1997)

Discography

Film songs

References

Living people
21st-century Bangladeshi male singers
Bangladeshi male television actors
Bangladeshi male film actors
Bangladeshi playback singers
Place of birth missing (living people)
Year of birth missing (living people)
20th-century Bangladeshi male singers